The 1938 Czechoslovak presidential election took place on 30 November 1938. The election was held following the Munich Agreement. Edvard Beneš resigned on his position and  Emil Hácha became the new president.

Voting
312 members of parliament voted. Hácha received 272 votes while 39 were blank.

References

Presidential
1938